Pseudopostega apotoma is a moth of the family Opostegidae. It is only known from Minas Gerais and Pará in south-eastern and north-eastern Brazil.

The length of the forewings is 3.4–3.7 mm. Adults are mostly white. Adults have been collected in January and November.

Etymology
The species name is derived from the Greek apotomos (cut off, abrupt) in reference to the blunt, stubby form of the caudal lobe of the male gnathos.

External links
A Revision of the New World Plant-Mining Moths of the Family Opostegidae (Lepidoptera: Nepticuloidea)

Opostegidae
Moths described in 2007